The Hornet's Nest is a 1955 British crime comedy film directed by Charles Saunders and starring Paul Carpenter, June Thorburn, and Marla Landi. It was released in May 1955.

Plot
Thief Posh Peterson hides his loot of £20,000 worth of jewels under the floor boards of an abandoned scow (named The Hornet's Nest) moored in London's Chelsea Embankment, but he is captured and thrown in jail after assaulting someone. Two young models, Pat and Terry, rent the vessel as a houseboat through Bob Bartlett, a friendly local salvage dealer acting as an intermediary for the rental agency. Upon his release, Posh and his accomplices, headed by Mr Arnold, attempt to recover the loot, but it is no longer under the floor boards. After several plot twists, Bartlett eventually brings the crooks to justice. Having observed all these events from their vantage point, two neighbouring elderly sisters, Becky and Rachael Crumb, end up with the goods, which they gift to the two models to help them claim the £2,000 reward money.

Cast
 Paul Carpenter as Bob Bartlett
 June Thorburn as Pat
 Marla Landi as Terry Savarese
 Alexander Gauge as Mr. Arnold
 Charles Farrell as Posh Peterson
 Larry Burns as Alfie
 Christine Silver as Becky Crumb
 Nora Nicholson as Rachael Crumb
 Christopher Steele as Vicar
 Jan Holden as Miss Wentworth
 Ronnie Stevens as Bill, the Photographer
 Max Brimmell as Staines
 Colin Douglas as Martin
 Wilfred Fletcher as Woolgar
 Trevor Reid as Detective Sergeant Filson
 Gaylord Cavallaro as Humphrey Holder
 Anita Bolster as Miss Anderson
 Stuart Nichol as Publican (uncredited)

References

External links 
  
  
  

1955 films
1950s crime comedy films
British black-and-white films
British comedy films
British detective films
British police films
British thriller films
Films directed by Charles Saunders
Films set in London
Films shot in London
Films shot at Riverside Studios
1950s English-language films
1950s British films